Emphasis, Stuttgart 1961 is an album by the Jimmy Giuffre 3 recorded live at the Liederhalle in Stuttgart, Germany, November 7, 1961, by the regional public broadcaster Sueddeutscher Rundfunk. It was first released in 1993 by hatArt and later Harmonia Mundi; it was re-released by HatOLOGY (another imprint of Hathut Records) in combination with a further recording from the same concert tour called Emphasis & Flight 1961 (2003).

Track listing
 "Whirrrr" – 4:15
 "Emphasis" – 7:48
 "Sonic" – 5:17
 "Venture" – 4:21
 "Jesus Maria" (Carla Bley) – 6:14
 "Stretching Out (Suite for Germany)" – 11:20
 "Carla" (Paul Bley) – 5:45
 "Cry, Want" – 7:00

All songs written by Jimmy Giuffre unless otherwise noted.

Personnel
Paul Bley – piano
Jimmy Giuffre – clarinet
Steve Swallow – double bass

References

1993 live albums
Jimmy Giuffre live albums
Hathut Records live albums
Harmonia Mundi live albums